Giannis Chrysafis (born 16 March 1981) is a Greek footballer, currently playing for AO Potamia in Gamma Ethniki.

References

External links 
 
Myplayer Profile

1981 births
Living people
Greek footballers
OFI Crete F.C. players
Paniliakos F.C. players
Aris Thessaloniki F.C. players
Levadiakos F.C. players
Egaleo F.C. players
Panthrakikos F.C. players
Panetolikos F.C. players
Trikala F.C. players
Panachaiki F.C. players
Ionikos F.C. players
Panegialios F.C. players
Association football midfielders